{
  "type": "ExternalData",
  "service": "page",
  "title": "State highways in New Jersey before 1927.map"
}

New Jersey was one of the first U.S. states to adopt a system of numbered state highways. New Jersey's original numbered highway system was first legislated in 1916, succeeding another proposal submitted in 1913 by the State Highway commission. By 1923, 24 routes had been numbered. Due to a lack of central organizing oversight, many routes were legislated, but not numbered. A partial renumbering was proposed in 1926 to eliminate duplicates and give numbers to all routes, and in 1927 a full renumbering was carried out.

History 
The earliest efforts for the state of New Jersey to maintain a network of highways dates back to 1891, when law was passed allotting funds for the construction of highways. This was bolstered in 1894 with the creation of a Commissioner of Public Roads, which evolved into the State Highway Commission in 1909. The first highways the commission created were the Ocean Highway and the Delaware River Drive, created in 1909 and 1911 respectively. The first effort at a state-wide highway network was begun by the commission in 1912 and submitted for approval in 1913. This system was never put in place; instead, the first permanent system to define a system of highways in the state was created by the Egan Bill (1916 state laws, chapter 285), which designated the initial system of 13 routes, bolstered by the Edge Bill (L. 1917 c. 14), which went into more detail on funding, maintenance, and similar issues. At this time most primary roads in the state had trail numbers which bore no resemblance to the highway numbers; these were soon obsoleted by the new system.  

However, after 1921, the process was less coordinated, as local politicians tried to get their route built without concern for duplication of numbers. The State Highway Commission was not allowed to change the numbers; the best they could do was assign suffixes. Where multiple routes existed with the same number, suffixes of N and S were used for the northernmost and southernmost. Starting in 1923, various unnumbered routes were also assigned; none of these were taken over by 1927.

Construction and maintenance transfers began by 1917 with Route 13 (the Lincoln Highway, now Route 27) north of Kingston; the routes were marked by 1922.

In 1926, a partial renumbering was proposed to eliminate duplicates and assign a number to every route; this would have given the system numbers from 1 to 30. Instead, a total renumbering was adopted in 1927 as public law chapter 319. This system - the 1927 renumbering - assigned numbers from 1 to 12 in northern New Jersey, 21 to 28 roughly radiating from Newark, 29 to 37 from Trenton, 38 to 47 from Camden, and 48 to 50 in South Jersey. Portions of the pre-1927 routes that had been taken over or built, but were not assigned new numbers, kept their old numbers. These four routes - Route 4N, Route 5N, Route 8N and Route 18N - were all assigned the suffix N (as the only suffixed one to remain was 18N, and the others needed to be distinguished from the new routes of the same number).

List of Routes

See also 

New Jersey State Routes
1927 New Jersey State Route renumbering
1953 New Jersey State Route renumbering

References

External links
New Jersey Highways

Lists of roads in New Jersey

 pre-1927